(Rv2361c, (2Z,6Z,10Z,14Z,18Z,22Z,26Z,30Z,34E)-decaprenyl diphosphate synthase) is an enzyme with systematic name  (adding 7 isopentenyl units) . This enzyme catalyses the following chemical reaction

 (2Z,6E)-farnesyl diphosphate + 7 isopentenyl diphosphate  7 diphosphate + trans,octacis-decaprenyl diphosphate

The enzyme is involved in the biosynthesis of decaprenyl phosphate.

References

External links 
 

EC 2.5.1